Bjorkdale  is a village in the Canadian province of Saskatchewan within the Rural Municipality of Bjorkdale No. 426 and Census Division No. 14.

History 
Bjorkdale incorporated as a village on April 1, 1968.

Demographics 

See also 

 List of communities in Saskatchewan
 Villages of Saskatchewan

References

External links
 

Villages in Saskatchewan
Bjorkdale No. 426, Saskatchewan
Division No. 14, Saskatchewan